AKPD Message and Media is an American political and media consulting firm catering to Democratic candidates and related causes. Formerly Axelrod and Associates, it is named after its four original partners: David Axelrod, John Kupper, David Plouffe, and John Del Cecato. 

All four partners were staff members on Barack Obama's 2008 presidential campaign, with Plouffe serving as campaign manager, Axelrod as senior strategist, and Del Cecato as media advisor. Axelrod, who is personally close to Obama, left AKPD to serve as senior advisor to the president in the Obama administration and sold the firm to Kupper, Del Cecato and Larry Grisolano. 

AKPD's advertising and strategy have been widely credited for significantly altering elections in their clients favor. Time praised one of their most talked-about ads, "Dante", as "The Ad that Won the New York Mayor's Race" for Bill de Blasio. 

AKPD's offices are located in Chicago, Washington DC, and New York where it has recently expanded its presence by partnering with Bully Pulpit Interactive and Analytics Media Group. According to  OpenSecrets, AKPD was the 37th-ranked campaign vendor of the 2018 election cycle, receiving nearly $23.3 million from federal campaigns and political committees.

Notable clients
Barack Obama during the 2008 United States presidential election and the 2012 United States presidential election
Bill de Blasio during the New York City Mayoral Election, 2013
Rahm Emanuel during the 2011 Chicago mayoral election
Deval Patrick during the 2010 Massachusetts gubernatorial election
John Edwards during the John Edwards presidential campaign, 2004
Herb Kohl during the United States Senate election in Wisconsin, 2006
Yulia Tymoshenko during the 2010 Ukrainian presidential election
Francisco de Narváez and Republican Proposal during the 2009 Argentine legislative election
Paul M. Simon during the United States Democratic Party Presidential Primaries, 1988

See also 

Organizing for America
Obama for America
Buffy Wicks

References

External links

American political consultants
Democratic Party (United States)